Francisco Ronaldo Silva Fernández (born 26 April 1983) is an Uruguayan-born Chilean footballer who last played for Primera B de Chile side Rangers.

Personal life
In January 2018, he naturalized Chilean by residence.

Honors

Club
San Marcos
 Primera B de Chile (1): 2013–14

Curicó Unido
 Primera B de Chile (1): 2016–17

References

External links
 Profile at BDFA 
 

1983 births
Living people
Footballers from Montevideo
Uruguayan footballers
Uruguayan expatriate footballers
Naturalized citizens of Chile
Uruguayan emigrants to Chile
Chilean footballers
Liverpool F.C. (Montevideo) players
Central Español players
Cobreloa footballers
Everton de Viña del Mar footballers
San Marcos de Arica footballers
Curicó Unido footballers
Rangers de Talca footballers
Uruguayan Primera División players
Chilean Primera División players
Primera B de Chile players
Uruguayan expatriate sportspeople in Chile
Expatriate footballers in Chile
Association football midfielders